Halifax, Nova Scotia has the largest selection of education options in Atlantic Canada.

Public schools
The Halifax Regional Centre for Education  (HRCE) is responsible for administering 135 public schools providing instruction from primary to grade 12. With over 57,000 students, the HRCE is the largest school board in Atlantic Canada. The Conseil scolaire acadien provincial operates six public French language schools in the Halifax region.

Private schools

There are 14 independent schools in the city, including:

 Armbrae Academy
 Bedford Academy
 Birch Hills Academy
 Churchill Academy
 East Coast Varsity
 Halifax Christian Academy
 Halifax Independent School
 Halifax Grammar School
 Maritime Conservatory of Performing Arts
 Maritime Muslim Academy
 Sacred Heart School of Halifax
 Sandy Lake Academy
 Shambhala School

Universities

The city is home to seven degree-granting post-secondary educational institutions. The following universities are located on the Halifax Peninsula:
 Dalhousie University
 Saint Mary's University
 University of King's College
 Atlantic School of Theology
 Nova Scotia College of Art and Design University
 Université Sainte-Anne, Halifax Campus

This university is located in suburban Rockingham:
 Mount Saint Vincent University

The former Technical University of Nova Scotia (TUNS) was merged into Dalhousie University.  The University of King's College remains an independent institution but its students have access to Dalhousie's arts and science faculties.

Cape Breton University has a satellite campus in Halifax for extension courses.

Community colleges
The Nova Scotia Community College network maintains three campuses in Halifax.

 Akerley Campus
 Institute of Technology Campus
 Ivany Campus (formerly called Waterfront Campus)

Private colleges
There are also a variety of private career and business colleges located in and around Halifax's urban core.

References